José Vidal Porcar (6 December 1924 – 15 June 1992) was a Spanish racing cyclist. He rode in the 1953 Tour de France.

References

External links
 

1924 births
1992 deaths
Spanish male cyclists
Place of birth missing
People from Baix Llobregat
Sportspeople from the Province of Barcelona
Cyclists from Catalonia
20th-century Spanish people